Harvey Gordon Mazinke (born April 6, 1937) is a Canadian former curler. He was the skip of the 1973 Brier Champion team, representing Saskatchewan. He later went on to win second place at the World Championships of that year. From 1987 to 1988, he was a president of Canadian Curling Association. In 1989, he was inducted to the Canadian Curling Hall of Fame.

References

External links
 

 Harvey Mazinke – Curling Canada Stats Archive

Brier champions
1937 births
Living people
Curlers from Saskatchewan
Canadian male curlers
Curlers from Manitoba
Curling Canada presidents